Eli Houston Murray (February 10, 1843 – November 18, 1896) was Governor of Utah Territory between 1880 and 1886. The city of Murray, Utah was named for him.

Murray had served in the Union Army during the American Civil War as colonel of the 3rd Kentucky Cavalry Regiment. He was brevetted to the rank of brigadier general when the war ended. In the next year he was appointed U.S. Marshal for Kentucky and stayed on that post for 10 years; afterwards managing a Kentucky newspaper.

Murray was appointed Governor of Utah Territory in 1880. The newly appointed anti-Mormon territorial governor openly supported the Liberal Party of Utah. Thus, the 1880 territory-wide election for a congressional delegate unexpectedly proved the closest that the Liberal Party got to sending a representative to Washington, D.C.

The Liberal candidate, Allen G. Campbell – with 1357 votes – lost resoundingly to Mormon General Authority George Q. Cannon who had 18,567 votes. However, before Governor Murray certified the election, a protest on behalf of Campbell was filed. The protest listed a dozen claims, chiefly that Cannon, born in Liverpool, England, was an un-naturalized alien. The protest also claimed that Cannon's practice of polygamy was incompatible with the law and a delegate's oath of office. Murray agreed and issued certification to Campbell in spite of his poor showing.

Cannon, in Washington at the time, argued that only Congress could decide on a member's qualifications. He furthermore received a certificate from sympathetic territorial election officials which stated he had received the most votes. This document convinced the House of Representatives clerk to enter Cannon's name on the roll, so Cannon began drawing delegate's salary.

Both Murray and Campbell traveled to Washington to dispute the seat. Each side battled over the position for over a year, even through the assassination and eventual death of President James Garfield. On February 25, 1882, the House of Representatives finally rejected both candidates. The House refused Cannon his seat not for his dubious citizenship, but for his practice of polygamy. The entire ordeal brought unfavorable national attention to Utah regarding the "Mormon Question" (polygamy).

Murray and his wife Eva Neale Murray (1852–1938) are buried at Arlington National Cemetery.

References

External links

 Biography of Murray at a Utah government website
 
 

Governors of Utah Territory
Mormonism-related controversies
1843 births
1896 deaths
Burials at Arlington National Cemetery
Liberal Party (Utah) politicians
19th-century American politicians
Union Army colonels
People from Breckinridge County, Kentucky